= Home Office Drugs Inspectorate =

Former agency of the UK's Home Office

The Home Office Drugs Inspectorate (also known as the Home Office Drugs Branch) was a branch of the British Home Office. It was formed in 1934, although its origins can be traced back to 1916, and one other reference speaks of June 1922. It was disbanded in 2007.

It was composed of two parts, the Home Office Drugs Inspectorate (HODI) and the Drug Legislation Enforcement Unit. The latter section issued the required licences and gave permission to make, possess and deliver controlled drugs, and also licensed the import and export of the same. The Inspectorate's inspectors inspect manufacturers and suppliers. The inspectors were not pharmacists or doctors and their experience was built up 'on the job' or by reference to previous cases. They could inspect general practitioner's surgeries, but only when they were notified that a problem may exist.

The inspectors had an important role in the early days of drug abuse, when some doctors were accused of over-prescribing drugs of dependence. Some inspectors, for instance, Henry Bryan "Bing" Spear, were of historical importance. Bing Spear was employed by the Home Office Drugs Branch from 1952–1986 and was its Chief Inspector from 1977. He was unusual for the time (maybe even today) for a civil servant in that he had an informal approach to both the addicts and the doctors who treated them. However, Bing was highly committed to the cause and authored a book, Heroin Addiction, Care and Control: The British System, which was published in 2002, following his death in 1995.
